The 1974 FIVB Women's World Championship was the seventh edition of the tournament, organised by the world's governing body, the FIVB. It was held from 13 to 27 October 1974 in Mexico.

Teams

 
 
 
 
 
 
 
 
 
 
 
 
 
 
  (withdraw)

Squads

Venues

Source:

Format
The tournament was played in three different stages (first, second and final rounds). A single round-robin format was played within each group to determine the teams group position, all teams progressed to the next round.

A single round-robin format was played within each group to determine the teams group position, all teams progressed to the next round.

A single round-robin format was played within each group to determine the final standings.

Pools composition

Results

First round

Pool A
Location: Guadalajara

|}

|}

Pool B
Location: Mexico City

|}

|}

Pool C
Location: Monterrey

|}

|}

Pool D
Location: Tijuana

|}
 North Korea withdraw after the draw

|}

Pool E
Location: Puebla City

|}

|}

Pool F
Location: Toluca de Lerdo

|}

|}

Second round

1st–12th pools

Pool G
Location: Guadalajara

|}

|}

Pool H
Location: Monterrey

|}

|}

Pool I
Location: Tijuana

|}

|}

13th–24th pools

Pool L
Location: Mexico City

|}

|}

Pool M
Location: Puebla City

|}

|}

Pool N
Location: Toluca de Lerdo

|}

|}

Final round

19th–24th places
Location: Mexico City

|}

|}

13th–18th places
Location: Puebla City

|}

|}

7th–12th places
Location: Monterrey

|}

|}

Final places
Location: Guadalajara

|}

|}

Final standing

References

External links
 FIVB Results
 Results - todor66
 Results
 Federation Internationale de Volleyball

FIVB Women's World Championship
International volleyball competitions hosted by Mexico
1974
1974 in Mexican women's sports
Sport in Guadalajara, Jalisco
October 1974 sports events in North America
October 1974 events in Mexico
Women's volleyball in Mexico